Andros Rodriguez is an American, multi-platinum, Grammy award-winning record producer, audio engineer and mixer.  His diverse catalog of clients include Pharrell, Justin Timberlake, Christina Aguilera, Florence + the Machine, Shakira, Bleachers, Whitney Houston, Cobra Starship, Santigold, Jewel, Lenny Kravitz, Kelly Clarkson, Girls' Generation, Patti LaBelle, James Blunt, Ludacris, and Huang Zitao.

History 
A native of Washington, D.C., Rodriguez began his career recording local bands.  In 2002, he moved to New York City and eventually earned the position of chief engineer at Quad Studios.  Since then he has gone on to work with artists around the world.  He is well known for his work with Shakira and was the co-producer and engineer for the Superbowl LIV Halftime Show.

Selected Discography 
 Madonna - MDNA- Engineer
Justin Timberlake - FutureSex/LoveSounds - Engineer
Santigold - Master of My Make-Believe - Engineer
Shakira - She Wolf - Engineer/ Mixing
Lion Babe - Begin - Engineer/ Mixing
Joywave - How Do You Feel Now? - Engineer
Take That - III - Mixing
Shakira - Sale el Sol - Engineer/ Mixing
Haerts - Haerts - Engineer
Bone Thugs-N-Harmony - Strength & Loyalty - Engineer/ Mixing
Shakira - Waka Waka (This Time for Africa) - Engineer/ Mixing
Christina Aguilera - Bionic - Engineer
Nicola Roberts - Cinderella's Eyes - Mixing
Oh Land - Wishbone - Engineer/ Mixing
Cobra Starship - While the City Sleeps, We Rule the Streets - Engineer/ Mixing
Jazmine Sullivan - Love Me Back - Engineer
Hugo - Old Tyme Religion - Engineer
The Dance Party - Tigers - Producer/ Engineer/ Mixing
Anberlin - Cities (Live in New York City) - Engineer
The Kickdrums - Thinking Out Loud - Producer/ Engineer/ Mixing Composer
Toshinobu Kubota - Time to Share - Assistant Engineer

References

External links 
 https://web.archive.org/web/20110629173041/http://www.aaminc.com/category.php?cat=4&id=121
 http://allmusic.com/artist/andros-rodriguez-p744797/credits
 http://www.sonicscoop.com/tag/andros-rodriguez/
 http://broadwayworld.com/people/Andros_Rodriguez/
 http://www.artistdirect.com/nad/store/movies/principal/0,,4020090,00.html
 https://web.archive.org/web/20110716154932/http://www.stratospheresound.com/news.php
 

Year of birth missing (living people)
Living people
Grammy Award winners
Record producers from Washington, D.C.
American audio engineers